Events from the year 1462 in Ireland.

Incumbent
Lord: Edward IV

Events
Battle of Piltown: Desmond defeats Butlers.
Glenquin Castle, is a tower house and National Monument located in County Limerick. Built by the Ó hAilgheanáin (O'Hallinans) in 1462, on the site of an older building dating back to AD 983.

Births

Deaths
 James FitzGerald, 6th Earl of Desmond

References

 
1460s in Ireland
Years of the 15th century in Ireland